Shorefast is a Canadian social enterprise with the mission to build economic and cultural resilience on Fogo Island, Newfoundland. Shorefast is helping to create a more diverse economy on Fogo Island through a variety of charitable programs (run by Shorefast Foundation, a registered Canadian charity) and social businesses (run by Shorefast Social Enterprises Inc.). Best known among these social businesses is the Fogo Island Inn, which has earned global accolades for exceptional design and place-specific hospitality. All of the furnishings in the Inn are made locally, and after visitors to the Inn expressed interest in purchasing the unique furniture and textile items that decorate the Inn, Shorefast founded The Woodshop on Fogo Island, another social business whose surpluses are reinvested in the community.

History 
Shorefast was formed in 2006 by siblings Zita, Alan, and Anthony Cobb to build another leg on the Island’s economy following the collapse of the Atlantic northwest cod fishery. Zita, who grew up on Fogo Island, left the island in 1975 to study business at Carleton University, and went on to become CFO of JDS Fitel, and then senior vice-president of strategy for fiber optics manufacturer JDS Uniphase. Following her career, she returned home to Fogo Island to start Shorefast’s work with her brothers. Cobb says that “the revitalization of Fogo Island over the past decade builds on the work of people decades before, who gathered to form the Fogo Island Co-operative to rebuild the economy when cod stocks drastically declined.” Shorefast is recognized as a social enterprise, on the basis that it uses business-minded means to achieve social ends. As the founder, Zita received the Order of Canada in 2016, Canada's highest honour, for the charity's efforts.

Charitable Programs

Fogo Island Arts 
Built upon the legacy of the National Film Board of Canada's Fogo Process, Fogo Island Arts is a founding initiative of Shorefast. The residency-based contemporary art venue hosts artists, designers, writers, filmmakers, musicians, curators, and thinkers from around the world. While on the Island, artists work in one of four artist studios designed by Newfoundland-born, Norway-based architect Todd Saunders. Artists-in-residence regularly participate in community engagements, often in the form of public talks, throughout the year and selected artists also present solo exhibitions at the Fogo Island Gallery, located in the Fogo Island Inn.

New Ocean Ethic 
New Ocean Ethic is a series of initiatives organized to support our oceans. Led by Gordon Slade, this program "helps to remind us that if we are to continue to benefit from our relationships with the sea, we must rethink the way we use its resources and exist responsibly on its shores". The program works with researchers, academics, practitioners, universities, organizations, communities and other stakeholders to build ocean health.

Geology at the Edge 
Geology at the Edge is Canada's first community-based geologist-in-residence program. This program "aims to combine the understanding or geological heritage with sustainable economic development focused upon geotourism, tourism that creates conditions for the socio-economic well-being of communities while maintaining their cultural and ecological integrity"

Boatbuilding 
Small wooden boats known as punts, and the skills required to make them, have been an essential part of the social and economic fabric of rural Newfoundland. Committed to ensuring the survival of this heritage Shorefast opened the Punt Premises in June 2019 in the community of Joe Batt’s Arm, Fogo Island. This was funded in full by the Government and a private donor.  The premises is a set of restored heritage buildings that serves as an interactive cultural interpretation center that encourages visitor interaction with the historical and cultural assets of the inshore fishery. Consisting of restored heritage buildings, the site serves as a community gathering space, boatbuilding education centre and offers punts for people to row in the harbour.

Academic Residencies 
In partnership with Memorial University of Newfoundland, in 2016 the Academics-in-Residence program was created. The program consists of a yearly group of academic fellows who visit Fogo Island to perform research, interact with the community, and share their areas of expertise.

Microlending 
Known as the Shorefast Business Assistance Fund, Shorefast provides micro-loans on friendly terms to those seeking to start a business on Fogo Island. The fund has granted loans to a diverse set of successful businesses on the Island and continues to accept applications

Vernacular Architecture 
A reflection of the needs of early settlers, many early structures built in Newfoundland were constructed of wood rather than stone and close to the shore to allow easy access to fishing grounds. Fogo Island’s contribution to this vernacular architecture still exists to this day. Shorefast invests in “restoring a number of heritage homes, churches, and public buildings in order to preserve Fogo Island’s distinct built heritage and give these structures continued relevance through continued use".

Geotourism 
Geotourism sustains or enhances the distinctive geographical character of a place including its environment, heritage, aesthetics, culture, and the well-being of its residents. Shorefast is committed to upholding the tenets of geotourism such that the best interests of Fogo Island’s natural environment, cultural legacy, people, and communities serve as the most important guideposts. The Fogo Island Inn stands as Shorefast’s major geotourism project on Fogo Island

Economic Development Partnership 
A joint partnership between Shorefast, the Town of Fogo Island and the Fogo Island Co-operative Society Limited, the Economic Development Partnership unites public and private on-Island leadership to encourage and facilitate economic development on Fogo Island. The partnership endeavors to create jobs, encourage youth ventures, and foster a unified economic vision for Fogo Island through the start-up and expansion of small and medium-sized businesses that complement the natural, cultural and other place-based assets of Fogo Island.

For-Profit Businesses

Fogo Island Inn 
Utilizing the principles of asset-based community development, Shorefast opened the Fogo Island Inn in 2013 as a way to express traditional knowledge and hospitality in new ways and to serve as an economic engine for Fogo Island. Designed by Newfoundland-born, Norway-based architect Todd Saunders, the Inn features 29 one-of-a-kind rooms and draws from the vernacular architecture found on the island. The furniture and textiles that decorate the Inn are handcrafted and primarily produced on Fogo Island – a result of the unique collaboration between international designers and the skilled artisans and craftspeople of Fogo Island.

The Inn was built with philanthropic funds, and all surplus profits are returned to Shorefast for reinvestment into the community. As such, there are no investors seeking a return, and no private gain. This model means that the community of Fogo Island is the beneficial owner of the Inn.

The Woodshop on Fogo Island 
By virtue of their geographic isolation, Fogo Islanders have become masters of making things by hand. Since they arrived as settlers in the late 1600s, Fogo Islanders have been building wooden boats, houses, tools and furniture and creating textiles in the form of knitting, quilting, rug hooking and more. Housed in the renovated Society of United Fishermen’s Hall in the community of Barr’d Islands on Fogo Island, The Woodshop on Fogo Island is the result of an innovative collaborative process between international designers and the artisans and craftspeople of Fogo Island. Furniture and textile pieces were created by this partnership for the Fogo Island Inn, but due to the popularity of the pieces among guests a brick and mortar shop was opened. The Woodshop employs staff year round, including woodworkers who cut, nail, glue, sand, finish and paint every item by hand. As a Shorefast social business, all items are priced to create a surplus, which is then reinvested back into the community.

Fogo Island Fish 
Sustained on primarily cod fishing for generations, fishing is tied to family life, culture and economy in Newfoundland and Labrador. During the mid-twentieth century, with the introduction of international factory-scale overfishing, cod populations fell drastically forcing the province to announce a cod moratorium in 1992, resulting in an estimated 30,000 job losses and a way of life. In recent years the inshore cod stocks have been rising, allowing people to once again begin to catch small quotas of fish.

Fogo Island Fish employs Fogo Islanders to catch cod using the traditional hand-line caught method, one at a time, resulting in zero by-catch. All caught within a five mile radius of the coast of Fogo Island, this close proximity allows fish to be processed within hours of being caught resulting in a superior product that has been lauded by the restaurant industry. Primarily supplying high-end restaurants in Ontario, Fogo Island Fish is able to pay their fishers well above market rates and surpluses are reinvested back into the community.

Fogo Island Fish was the subject of the National Film Board short-documentary HAND.LINE.COD. directed by Justin Simms, that premiered at the Toronto International Film Festival in September 2016.

Cauliflower Thinking

Economic Nutrition Label 
In 2017, Shorefast launched its Economic Nutrition Label. The labels, available for most of The Woodshop on Fogo Island’s retail items, as well as for the cost of a stay at Fogo Island Inn, show “where the money goes” when consumers make purchases at Shorefast's social businesses. As a play on the classic nutrition fact labels legally required on food products in most countries, the Economic Nutrition Label shows how much of the purchase price of any particular item goes towards production processes including labour, materials, or operations, as well as the money’s geographical destination. The labels "are intended to bring transparency to where the money from your purchase goes – how it will be invested in the local community and how it impacts the broader economy."

References 

Charities based in Canada
Canadian companies established in 2006